Algeria competed at the 1984 Summer Olympics in Los Angeles, United States.  That nation won íts first ever Olympic medals at these Games.

Medalists

Results by event

Athletics

Men's 200 metres
 Ali Bakhta

Men's 800 metres
 Ahmed Belkessam

Men's 1,500 metres
 Mehdi Aidet
 Abderrahmane Morceli

Men's 5,000 metres
Abdelrazzak Bounour
 Heat — 13:51.52
 Semifinals — 13:57.43 (→ did not advance)

Men's 110 metres Hurdles
Mohamed Ryad Benhaddad

Men's 20 km Walk
 Abdelouahab Ferguene
 Final — 1:31:24 (→ 26th place)
 Benamar Kechkouche
 Final — 1:34:12 (→ 30th place)

Men's Hammer Throw 
 Hakim Toumi
 Qualification — 67.68m (→ did not advance)

Boxing

Men's Bantamweight (– 54 kg)
Mustapha Kouchene
 First Round — Bye
 Second Round — Lost to Dale Walters (Canada), 0-5

Men's Bantamweight (– 57 kg)
Azzedine Said
 First Round — Bye
 Second Round — Lost to Omar Catari (Venezuela), after referee stopped contest in second round

Men's Bantamweight (– 63,5 kg)
Ahmed Hadjala
 First Round — Bye
 Second Round — Defeated Umesh Maskey (Nepal), after referee stopped contest in second round
 Third Round – Lost to Jean Mbereke (Cameroon), on points (1:4)

Men's Bantamweight (– 67,5 kg)
Kamel Abboud
 First Round — Bye
 Second Round — Defeated Henry Kalunga (Zambia), on points (5:0)
 Third Round – Lost to Alexander Küzler (West Germany), on points (1:4)

Men's Middleweight (– 75 kg)
 Mohamed Zaoui →  Bronze Medal
 First Round – Bye
 Second Round – Defeated Tsiu Monne (Lesotho), after referee stopped contest in second round
 Quarterfinals – Defeated Moses Mwaba (Zambia), on points (4:1)
 Semifinals – Lost to Virgil Hill (United States), on points (0:5)

Men's Middleweight (– 81 kg)
 Mustapha Moussa →  Bronze Medal
 First Round – Bye
 Second Round – Defeated Drake Thadzi (Malawi), on points (5:0)
 Quarterfinals – Defeated Anthony Wilson (Great Britain), on points (5:0)
 Semifinals – Lost to Anton Josipović (Yugoslavia), on points (0:5)

Men's Bantamweight (– 91 kg)
Mohamed Bouchiche
 First Round — Bye
 Second Round — Lost to Willie DeWit (Canada), on points (0:5)

Handball

Men's Team Competition
Preliminary Round (Group A)
Lost to Yugoslavia (10:25)
Lost to Romania (16:25)
Lost to Iceland (15:19)
Lost to Switzerland (18:19)
Lost to Japan (16:17)
Classification Match
11th/12th place: Lost to South Korea (21:25) → 12th place
Team Roster
Omar Azeb
Djaffar Belhocine
Abdelkrim Bendjemil
Abdesselam Benmaghsoula
Brahim Boudrali
Mourad Boussebt
Mustapha Doballah
Alousofiane Draouci
Hocine Ledra
Kamel Maoudj
Mouloud Meknache
Zine Mohamed Seghir
Rachid Mokrani
Kamel Ouchia
Azzedine Ouhib

References
Official Olympic Reports
International Olympic Committee results database

Nations at the 1984 Summer Olympics
1984
Olympics